Romanovsky District is the name of several administrative and municipal districts in Russia:
Romanovsky District, Altai Krai, an administrative and municipal district of Altai Krai
Romanovsky District, Saratov Oblast, an administrative and municipal district of Saratov Oblast

See also
Romanovsky (disambiguation)

References